Joseph Duffy (1860 – 1936) was an Australian cricketer. He played one first-class cricket match for Victoria in 1888.

See also
 List of Victoria first-class cricketers

References

External links
 

1860 births
1936 deaths
Australian cricketers
Victoria cricketers
Sportspeople from Ballarat